Zhang Zhiwu (born November 25, 1989 in Fuzhou, Jiangxi) is a Chinese sprint canoer who competed in the late 2000s. He finished fifth in the C-2 1000 m event at the 2008 Summer Olympics in Beijing.

References

Sports-Reference.com profile

1989 births
Canoeists at the 2008 Summer Olympics
Living people
Olympic canoeists of China
People from Fuzhou, Jiangxi
Sportspeople from Jiangxi
Chinese male canoeists